Reginald "Reggie" Workman (born June 26, 1937 in Philadelphia, Pennsylvania) is an American avant-garde jazz and hard bop double bassist, recognized for his work with both John Coltrane and Art Blakey.

Career

Early in his career, Workman worked in jazz groups led by Gigi Gryce, Donald Byrd, Duke Jordan and Booker Little. In 1961, Workman joined the John Coltrane Quartet, replacing Steve Davis. He was present for the saxophonist's Live at the Village Vanguard sessions, and also recorded with a second bassist (Art Davis) on the 1961 album, Olé Coltrane. Workman left Coltrane's group at the end of the year, following a European tour.

In 1962, Workman joined Art Blakey's Jazz Messengers (replacing long-time Blakey bassist Jymie Merritt), and worked alongside Freddie Hubbard, Wayne Shorter, and Cedar Walton for most of his time in the Jazz Messengers. Workman left Blakey's group in 1964.

Workman also played with James Moody, Yusef Lateef, Pharoah Sanders, Herbie Mann and Thelonious Monk. He has recorded with Archie Shepp, Lee Morgan and David Murray. Workman, with pianist Tommy Flanagan and drummer Joe Chambers, formed The Super Jazz Trio in 1978.

He is currently a professor at The New School for Jazz and Contemporary Music in New York City, and was a member of the group, Trio 3, with Oliver Lake and Andrew Cyrille.

Workman has been a resident of Montclair, New Jersey.

Honors and awards
In 1997, Workman was named as the recipient of a Life Achievement Award by the Jazz Foundation of America and was awarded a citation of excellence by the International Association of Jazz Educators. In 1999, the Mid Atlantic Arts Foundation presented him with its Living Legacy Award. In 2020, he received a Guggenheim Fellowship in music composition and was named an NEA Jazz Master.

Discography

As leader/co-leader

 1977: Conversation (with Cecil Bridgewater, Slide Hampton, George Adams, Albert Dailey, Michael Carvin, Lawrence Killian)
 1978: The Super Jazz Trio (Baystate)
 1978: The Works of Workman (Denon Japan)
 1979: Something Tasty (Baystate)
 1980: The Standard (Baystate)
 1986: Synthesis (Leo)
 1989: Images (Music & Arts)
 1993: Altered Spaces (Leo)
 1994: Summit Conference (Postcards)
 1995: Cerebral Caverns (Postcards)

With Trio Transition
Trio Transition (DIW, 1987)
Trio Transition with Special Guest Oliver Lake (DIW, 1988)

With Trio 3
Live in Willisau (Dizim, 1997)
Encounter (Passin' Thru, 2000)
Open Ideas (Palmetto, 2002)
Time Being (Intakt, 2006)
Wha's Nine: Live at the Sunset (Marge, 2008)
Berne Concert with Irene Schweizer (Intakt, 2009)
At This Time (Intakt, 2009)
Celebrating Mary Lou Williams–Live at Birdland New York with Geri Allen (Intakt, 2011)
Refraction – Breakin' Glass (Intakt, 2013)
Wiring (Intakt, 2014)
Visiting Texture (Intakt, 2017)

As sideman
With Juhani Aaltonen
 Strings Revisited (Tum, 2002)
 Reflections (Tum, 2004) with Andrew Cyrille 
 Prana / Live at Groovy (Leo, 1982)

With Roy Ayers
 Virgo Vibes (Atlantic, 1967)

With Gary Bartz
 Another Earth (Milestone, 1969)

With Art Blakey
 Caravan (Riverside, 1963)
 Ugetsu (Riverside, 1963)
 Free for All (Blue Note, 1964)
 Kyoto (Riverside, 1964)
 Indestructible (Blue Note, 1964)
 Golden Boy (Colpix, 1964)

With Hamiet Bluiett
 Orchestra Duet and Septet (Chiaroscuro, 1977)

With The Bridgewater Brothers
 Lightning and Thunder (Denon, 1977)
 Generation Suite (Denon, 1978)

With Roy Brooks
 Ethnic Expressions (Im-Hotep, 1973)
 Live At Town Hall (Baystate, 1978)

With Marion Brown
Vista (Impulse!, 1975)
 Passion Flower (Baystate, 1978)

With Donald Byrd
 Byrd in Flight (Blue Note, 1960)

With Don Byron
 Tuskegee Experiments (Nonesuch, 1990-91 [1992])

With Steve Cohn
 Shapes, Sounds, Theories (Cadence Jazz, 1984)
 Bridge Over the X-Stream (Leo, 1999)

With Earl Coleman
Manhattan Serenade (1968)

With Johnny Coles
Katumbo (Mainstream, 1971)

With Adegoke Steve Colson
 The Untarnished Dream (Silver Sphinx, 2009)

With Alice Coltrane
 World Galaxy (Impulse!, 1972)
 Transfiguration (Warner Bros. Master, 1978)

With John Coltrane
Africa/Brass (Impulse!, 1961)
Ole Coltrane (Atlantic, 1961)
The Complete Copenhagen Concert (Magnetic, 1961)
Coltrane "Live" at the Village Vanguard  (Impulse!, 1961 [1962])
The Complete 1961 Village Vanguard Recordings (Impulse!, 1961 [1997]) – contains recordings also on Impressions and the above release
Newport '63 (Impulse!, 1961 [1993])
Ballads (Impulse!, 1961-1962 [1963])
Impressions (Impulse!, 1961–1963 [1963])
Live Trane: The European Tours (Pablo, 1961-1963 [2001])

With Stanley Cowell
Brilliant Circles (Freedom, 1972)
Such Great Friends (1983) with Billy Harper and Billy Hart

With Marilyn Crispell
 Gaia (Leo, 1988)
 Live in San Francisco (Music & Arts, 1989)
 Live in Zurich (Leo, 1990)
 Circles (Les Disques Victo, 1991)
 Highlights from the Summer of 1992 American Tour (Music & Arts, 1993)

With Andrew Cyrille
 My Friend Louis (DIW, 1992)

With Sussan Deyhim
 Madman of God: Divine Love Songs of the Persian Sufi Masters (Cramworld, 2000)
 Shy Angels: Reconstruction and Mix Translation of Madman of God (Cramworld, 2002) with Bill Laswell

With Bill Dixon
 Intents and Purposes (RCA, 1967)

With Eric Dolphy
 Softly, As in a Morning Sunrise (Natasha, 1961)

With Booker Ervin
The Space Book (Prestige, 1964)
The Trance (Prestige, 1965)
Setting the Pace (Prestige, 1965) – with Dexter Gordon

With Mario Escalera
 Blue Mondays (Phoenix, 1981)

With Chris Fagan
 Lost Bohemia (Open Minds, 1992)

With Art Farmer
 New York Jazz Sextet: Group Therapy (Scepter, 1966)

With Sonny Fortune
Awakening (Horizon, 1975)
 In the Spirit of John Coltrane (Shanachie, 2000)

With Hal Galper
 Art-Work (Origin, 2008)

With Grant Green
Goin' West (Blue Note, 1962)

With Gigi Gryce
Saying Somethin'! (New Jazz, 1960)
Reminiscin' (Mercury, 1960)

With Billy Harper
Capra Black (Strata-East, 1973)

With Andrew Hill
Grass Roots (Blue Note, 1968 [2000])

With Terumasa Hino
 Love Nature (Canyon/Love, 1971)
 Peace and Love (Canyon/Love, 1971)
 A Part (Canyon/Love, 1971)
 Double Rainbow (CBS/Sony, 1981)

With Takehiro Honda
Jodo (Trio, 1972)

With Freddie Hubbard
Hub-Tones (Blue Note, 1962)
Here to Stay (Blue Note, 1962)
 The Body & the Soul (Impulse!, 1964)
 The Black Angel (Atlantic, 1970)

With Bobby Hutcherson
Patterns (Blue Note, 1968)

With The Jazz Composer's Orchestra
 The Jazz Composer's Orchestra (JCOA, 1968)

With Elvin Jones
 Brother John (1982)

With Clifford Jordan
Hello, Hank Jones (Eastworld, 1978)

With Duke Jordan
Flight to Jordan (Blue Note, 1960)

With Oliver Lake
Again and Again (Gramavision, 1991)
Edge-ing (Black Saint, 1993)

With Yusef Lateef
1984 (Impulse!, 1965)
Psychicemotus (Impulse!, 1965)
A Flat, G Flat and C (Impulse!, 1966)

With Booker Little
Booker Little and Friend (Bethlehem, 1961)

With Living Colour
 Time's Up (Epic, 1990)

With Herbie Mann
Our Mann Flute (Atlantic, 1966)
Impressions of the Middle East (Atlantic, 1966)
A Mann & A Woman (Atlantic, 1966) with Tamiko Jones
The Beat Goes On (Atlantic, 1967)
The Wailing Dervishes (Atlantic, 1967)
 New Mann at Newport (Atlantic, 1967)

With Miya Masaoka
 Monk's Japanese Folk Song (Dizim, 1997)

With Cristina Mazza
 Where Are You? (Il Posto, 1989)

With Ken McIntyre 
Home (SteepleChase, 1975)

With Roscoe Mitchell
In Walked Buckner (Delmark, 1999)

With Grachan Moncur III
 Shadows (Denon, 1977)

With James Moody
 Running The Gamut (Scepter, 1965)

With Lee Morgan
Search For The New Land (Blue Note, 1964)
Infinity (Blue Note, 1965 [1981])
Caramba (blue Note, 1968)
Taru (Blue Note, 1968)
Live in Baltimore 1968 (Fresh Sound Records, 1968) with Clifford Jordan
The Last Session (Blue Note, 1971 [1972])

With David Murray
 Morning Song (Black Saint, 1983)

With New York Art Quartet
Mohawk (Fontana, 1965)
35th Reunion (DIW, 2000)
Call It Art (Triple Point, 2013)

With Dave Pike
It's Time for Dave Pike (Riverside, 1961)

With Sam Rivers
 Crystals (Verve, 1974)

With Max Roach
 Nommo (Victor, 1976)
 Live in Tokyo (Denon, 1977)
 The Loadstar (Horo, 1977)
 Live in Amsterdam (Baystate, 1977)

With Charlie Rouse
 We Paid Our Dues! (Epic, 1961)

With Hilton Ruiz
 Fantasia (Denon, 1977)

With Pharoah Sanders
Karma (1969)

With Ellen May Shashoyan
 Song For My Father (New Ark, 1989)

With Archie Shepp
Archie Shepp – Bill Dixon Quartet (1962)
 Four for Trane (Impulse!, 1964)
The Magic of Ju-Ju (Impulse!, 1967)
 Ballads for Trane (Denon, 1977)
 Live in New York (Verve, 2001) with Roswell Rudd

With Wayne Shorter
Night Dreamer (1964)
JuJu (1964)
Adam's Apple (1966)

With Sonny Simmons
American Jungle (1997)

With Heiner Stadler
 Brains on Fire (Labor Records, 1966-73)
 Ecstasy (Labor, 1973) with Walter Steffens
 A Tribute to Monk and Bird (Tomato, 1978) with Thad Jones, George Adams, George Lewis, Stanley Cowell, and Lenny White
 Jazz Alchemy (Tomato, 1989)

With Sonny Stitt
 Moonlight in Vermont (Denon, 1977)

With Monnette Sudler
 Other Side of the Gemini (Hardly, 1988)

With Aki Takase
 Clapping Music (Enja, 1995)

With Horace Tapscott
Aiee! The Phantom (Arabesque, 1996)

With John Tchicai and Andrew Cyrille 
 Witch's Scream (TUM, 2006)

With Charles Tolliver
Live at the Loosdrecht Jazz Festival (Strata-East, 1973)
Impact (Strata-East, 1975)
 Emperor March: Live at the Blue Note (Half Note, 2008)

With Mickey Tucker
 Blues in Five Dimensions (SteepleChase, 1989)

With Edward Vesala
 Heavy Life (Leo, 1980)

With Mal Waldron
Up Popped the Devil (Enja, 1973)
Breaking New Ground (Baybridge 1983)
Mal Waldron Plays Eric Satie (Baybridge, 1983)
You and the Night and the Music (Paddle Wheel, 1983)
The Git Go - Live at the Village Vanguard (Soul Note, 1986)
The Seagulls of Kristiansund (Soul Note, 1986)
The Super Quartet Live at Sweet Basil (Paddle Wheel, 1987)
Crowd Scene (Soul Note, 1989)
Where Are You? (Soul Note, 1989)
My Dear Family (Evidence, 1993)
Soul Eyes (BMG, 1997)

With Cedar Walton
Soul Cycle (Prestige, 1969)

With Tyrone Washington
Natural Essence (1967)

With Richard Williams
New Horn in Town (Candid, 1960)

With Frank Wright
 Kevin, My Dear Son (Sun, 1979)

With Attila Zoller
 Gypsy Cry (Embryo Records, 1970)

References

External links 
Reggie Workman's official website.
The New School for Jazz and Contemporary Music

1937 births
Living people
American jazz double-bassists
Male double-bassists
Hard bop double-bassists
The Jazz Messengers members
Musicians from New Jersey
Musicians from Philadelphia
The New School faculty
People from Montclair, New Jersey
Postcards Records artists
Avant-garde jazz double-bassists
Jazz musicians from New York (state)
Jazz musicians from Pennsylvania
21st-century double-bassists
American male jazz musicians
Mingus Dynasty (band) members
New York Art Quartet members
Leo Records artists
Black Saint/Soul Note artists
Music & Arts artists